Henry Antonio Mateo Valera (born October 14, 1976 in Santo Domingo, Dominican Republic) is a professional baseball infielder. He played all or part of six seasons in Major League Baseball from 2001–06, and part of the 2010 season in Chinese Professional Baseball League.

Professional career

Expos/Nationals 
Mateo was drafted by the Montreal Expos at age 18 in the second round of the 1995 amateur draft. He spent the next 6 years in the Expos' minor league system before making his major league debut in 2001. He remained with the team when they moved to Washington, D.C. and became the Nationals in 2005. After batting .154 in 2006, he was granted free agency after the season.

Tigers, Rays, and independent ball 
In 2007, he signed with the Detroit Tigers, spending all of that season with their top farm team, the Toledo Mud Hens. He was released by the Detroit Tigers on April 21, . Later in 2008 signed with the Bridgeport Bluefish of the Atlantic League of Professional Baseball. He batted .318 for the Bluefish and led his team in hits with 170. On May 24, 2009, Mateo was signed to a minor league contract by the Tampa Bay Rays and immediately optioned to the minor league Durham Bulls, where he ended the season.
Mateo is currently being sought for the civil charge of criminal conversation in North Carolina.

Mexico and Taiwan 
Mateo became a free agent again after the 2009 season. He then went to the Mexican League, signing with the Vaqueros Laguna. He was later traded to the Diablos Rojos del México, but was subsequently released. In July, Mateo was signed by Uni-President 7-Eleven Lions in Chinese Professional Baseball League in Taiwan. He finished the year there, and returned to Mexico with the Olmecas de Tabasco in 2011.

External links

1976 births
Algodoneros de Guasave players
Bridgeport Bluefish players
Cañeros de Los Mochis players
Cape Fear Crocs players
Central American and Caribbean Games bronze medalists for the Dominican Republic
Competitors at the 2014 Central American and Caribbean Games
Diablos Rojos del México players
Dominican Republic expatriate baseball players in Canada
Dominican Republic expatriate baseball players in Mexico
Dominican Republic expatriate baseball players in Taiwan
Dominican Republic expatriate baseball players in the United States
Durham Bulls players
Edmonton Trappers players
Estrellas Orientales players
Gulf Coast Expos players
Harrisburg Senators players
Jupiter Hammerheads players
Leones del Escogido players

Living people
Major League Baseball players from the Dominican Republic
Major League Baseball second basemen
Mexican League baseball outfielders
Mexican League baseball second basemen
Mexican League baseball shortstops
Mexican League baseball third basemen
Montreal Expos players
Naranjeros de Hermosillo players
New Orleans Zephyrs players
Olmecas de Tabasco players
Ottawa Lynx players
Potomac Nationals players
Saraperos de Saltillo players
Senadores de San Juan players
Dominican Republic expatriate baseball players in Puerto Rico
Tigres del Licey players
Toledo Mud Hens players
Uni-President 7-Eleven Lions players
Vaqueros Laguna players
Vermont Expos players
Venados de Mazatlán players
Washington Nationals players
Central American and Caribbean Games medalists in baseball